Creighton Wade Gubanich (born March 27, 1972) is an American former professional baseball player who played briefly in the Major league baseball (MLB) in 1999 for the Boston Red Sox. Gubanich's primary position was catcher, though he also made two appearances as a designated hitter and played seven innings at third base.

Career
Gubanich was selected by the Oakland Athletics in the sixth round, 117th pick overall of the 1990 Major League Baseball draft  and signed with the Athletics on August 6, 1990. He remained in Oakland's minor league system until he was traded in 1997 to the Milwaukee Brewers for minor league pitcher Tony Phillips. On August 5, Gubanich was dealt to the Colorado Rockies as the player to be named later in an April 23 trade for infielder Jeff Huson.

Gubanich became a free agent at the end of the season and, on October 21, 1997, signed with the San Diego Padres for the  campaign. He appeared in 86 games with the Las Vegas Stars of the Pacific Coast League, San Diego's AAA affiliate, and hit .291 with 19 home runs and 70 RBI.

Gubanich filed for free agency at the end of the 1998 season and signed on with the Boston Red Sox. He made his Major League Baseball debut with the Red Sox on April 16,  against the Tampa Bay Devil Rays as a defensive replacement for Reggie Jefferson, who had pinch-hit for Boston catcher Jason Varitek. He made his first career start on April 22 against the Detroit Tigers, going 0-for-3 with a strikeout. Gubanich picked up his first hit in historic fashion on May 3, hitting a grand slam off Oakland A's pitcher Jimmy Haynes. With his big shot, Gubanich became only the fourth player in Major League Baseball history to hit a grand slam as their first career hit.

Despite his historic slam, Gubanich's time in the big leagues was short-lived as he appeared in just 15 more games with the Red Sox and was released in October 1999. He spent the next four seasons in the minor leagues and playing with independent league clubs, but never made it back to the big leagues.

References

External links
, or Baseball Almanac, or Retrosheet, or Baseball Reference (Minor and Independent leagues), or Pura Pelota (Venezuelan Winter League)

1972 births
Living people
American expatriate baseball players in Canada
Atlantic City Surf players
Baseball players from New Jersey
Boston Red Sox players
Camden Riversharks players
Cardenales de Lara players
American expatriate baseball players in Venezuela
Charlotte Knights players
Chattanooga Lookouts players
Colorado Springs Sky Sox players
Columbus Clippers players
Edmonton Trappers players
Huntsville Stars players
Indianapolis Indians players
Las Vegas Stars (baseball) players
Madison Muskies players
Major League Baseball catchers
Modesto A's players
Pawtucket Red Sox players
People from Belleville, New Jersey
Southern Oregon A's players
Sportspeople from Essex County, New Jersey
Tiburones de La Guaira players
Tucson Toros players